is a city located in Nara Prefecture, Japan. , the city has an estimated population of 124,829, with 52,034 households. Population density is around 3,176.79 persons per km2, and the total area is 39.52 km2.

The city was founded on February 11, 1956. The former mayor was Yutaka Asoda, who was elected to his third term of office in 2003. The present mayor is Yutaka Morishita, who was elected in 2007.

The exact spot of Emperor Jimmu's accession to the imperial throne (i.e. the foundation of Japan) was debated for centuries until in 1863 scholars of national studies claimed to have identified an area within Kashihara as the exact location. The city was the location of the Imperial capital Fujiwara-kyō, from 694 to 710.

In the late 16th century it was said to be one of the two richest autonomous cities of Japan, as in Umi no Sakai, Riku no Imai (tr. "by the sea, Sakai – inland, Imai" - Imai or :ja:今井町 is now a part of Kashihara).

On 8 July 2022, after former Japanese Prime Minister Shinzo Abe was shot while campaigning in Nara City, he was taken to Nara Medical University Hospital in Kashihara for treatment, but died there.

Transport

Rail
Kintetsu Railway
Osaka Line: (<< for Osaka) - Masuga - Yamato-Yagi - Miminashi - (for Toba, Nagoya >>)
Kashihara Line: (<< for Kyoto) - Ninokuchi - Yamato-Yagi - Yagi-nishiguchi - Unebigoryomae - Kashiharajingu-mae (line terminus)
Minami Osaka Line: Bojo - Kashiharajingu-nishiguchi - Kashiharajingu-mae - (Yoshino Line >>)
Yoshino Line: (<< Minami-Osaka Line) - Kashiharajingu-mae - Okadera - (Yoshino >>)
West Japan Railway Company
Sakurai Line: (<< for Yamatotakada) - Unebi - (for Nara >>)

Road
Expressways
Keinawa Expressway
Japan National Route 24
Japan National Route 165
Japan National Route 166
Japan National Route 169

Gallery

See also
 Yagi

References

External links

 
Kashihara City official tourism website (English)

 
Cities in Nara Prefecture
1956 establishments in Japan